Haji Abdul Salam (1 March 1948, Heibong Makhong, District Thoubal (Manipur) – 28 February 2017) was an Indian politician. He was a Member of Parliament, representing Manipur State in the Rajya Sabha (the upper house of India's Parliament) for the second term of 2014 until his death in 2017.

He belonged to the Indian National Congress  political party.

Salam died on 28 February 2017 at the age of 68, one day short of his 69th birthday.

References

1948 births
2017 deaths
Rajya Sabha members from Manipur
People from Thoubal district
Manipur politicians